Severen Tsentralen Planning Region is a planning region of Bulgaria, encompassing five Bulgarian provinces: Ruse, Veliko Tarnovo, Gabrovo, Targovishte and Razgrad.

The region is mostly inhabited by Bulgarians, Turkish and Romani people. Its largest cities are Ruse (population 143,000), Gabrovo (48,000) and Veliko Tarnovo (130,000, including hinterland).

Severen Tsentralen has a GDP per capita (PPS) of 10,200 (34% of the EU28 average) making it one of the least developed regions of Europe. The two main economic centres are Veliko Turnovo, the capital of the Second Bulgarian Empire and Ruse, Bulgaria's largest fluvial port.

See also 
 NUTS of Bulgaria

References

Regions of Bulgaria